Raul Christiano Machado Cortez (28 August 1932 – 18 July 2006) was a Brazilian stage, television, and film actor, director and producer. Cortez died of pancreatic cancer in 2006, aged 73.

Filmography

O Pão Que o Diabo Amassou (1957)
The Obsessed of Catule (1965) - Joaquim
Cristo de Lama (1966)
Case of the Naves Brothers (1967) - Joaquim Naves
O Anjo Assassino (1967) - Victor
O Homem Que Comprou o Mundo (1968)
Desesperato (1968)
Capitu (1969) - Escobar
Brazil Year 2000 (1969) - Man who protests
Tempo de Violência (1969)
Toninho on the Rocks (1970, TV Series)
Beto Rockfeller (1970)
A Arte de Amar Bem (1970) - Ronaldo (segment "A Inconfidência de Ser Esposa")
Roberto Carlos a 300 Quilômetros por Hora (1971) - Rodolfo
A Infidelidade ao Alcance de Todos (1972) - (segment "Tuba, A")
Vitória Bonelli (1972, TV Series) - Jaime Bonelli
Janaina - A Virgem Proibida (1972) - Raul
A Volta de Beto Rockfeller (1973, TV Series) - Aluisio
Xeque-Mate (1976, TV Series) - Sebastião
Tchan! A Grande Sacada (1976-1977, TV Series) - Aquilino Matos Madeira
O Seminarista (1977)
Pecado Sem Nome (1978)
Os Trombadinhas (1980) - Juiz
Água Viva (1980, TV Series) - Miguel Fragonard
Baila Comigo (1981, TV Series) - Joaquim 'Quim' Gama
Jogo da Vida (1981, TV Series) - Carlito Madureira
Tensão no Rio (1982)
Amor de Perversão (1982)
Moinhos de Vento (1983, TV Mini-Series) - Ronaldo
Partido Alto (1984, TV Series) - Célio Cruz
Sabor de Mel (1985 TV Series)
Vera (1986) - Professor Paulo
Mandala (1987, TV Series) - Pedro Bergman
Os Trapalhões no Auto da Compadecida (1987) - Major
Brega & Chique (1987, TV Series) - Herbert Alvaray / Cláudio Serra / Mário Francis
Jardim de Alah (1988)
Rainha da Sucata (1990, TV Series) - Jonas
Você Decide (1992, TV Series)
As Noivas de Copacabana (1992, TV Mini-Series) - José Carlos Montese
Mulheres de Areia (1993, TV Series) - Virgílio Assunção
Um Céu de Estrelas (1996)
O Rei do Gado (1996-1997, TV Series) - Jeremias Berdinazi Eco
Terra Nostra (1999-2000, TV Series) - Francesco Magliano
To the Left of the Father (2001) - Yohana / Father
Os Maias (2001, TV Mini-Series) - Narrator (voice)
Esperança (2002, TV Series) - Genaro
As Filhas da Mãe (2001-2002, TV Series) - Arthur Brandão
The Other Side of the Street (2004) - Camargo
Senhora do Destino (2004, TV Series) - Pedro
JK (2006, TV Mini-Series) - Antônio Carlos Andrada
Garoto Cósmico (2007) - Giramundos (voice) (final film role)

External links
 

1932 births
2006 deaths
Brazilian LGBT actors
Brazilian male film actors
Brazilian male television actors
Brazilian male telenovela actors
Brazilian people of Spanish descent
Deaths from pancreatic cancer
Deaths from cancer in São Paulo (state)
Brazilian people of Portuguese descent
Portuguese people of Brazilian descent
Male actors from Rio de Janeiro (city)
Male actors from São Paulo